Satyrium herzi is a butterfly of the subfamily Lycaeninae. It was described by Johann Heinrich Fixsen in 1887. It is found in the Russian Far East (Amur, Ussuri), north-eastern China and Korea.

The larvae feed on Malus mandschurica, Malus baccata and Malus pallasiana.

Description from Seitz

T. herzi Fixs. (= phellodendri Stgr. i. I.) (73d). Hindwing tailless, two teeth above the anal angle. Upperside unicolorous, the male with a pale scent-spot. Underside traversed by two rows of black-centred ocelli, there being a similar spot at the apex of the cell. Hindwing beneath with small red anal band. Fixsen has proposed the names ab. fulva and ab. fulvofenestrata for specimens with a more or less large futvo- yellow discal patch on the forewing. — Amurland, Corea. Larva velvety, uniformly dark green, beneath more bluish green, with the head glossy black. In June adult on Pyrus. Pupa light green, with a brownish violet saddle-spot (Graeser). The butterfly appears in July, flying particularly about the twigs of Phellodendron amurense.

References

 "Satyrium herzi (Fixsen, 1887)". Insecta.pro. Retrieved February 6, 2020.

Butterflies described in 1887
Satyrium (butterfly)
Butterflies of Asia